The White Album is a Danish folk pop band founded in 2011. The 3-member band is made up of Frederik Vedersø (guitar), Claus Arvad (guitar and mandolin) and Jakob Eilsø (guitar). All members originate from Funen in Denmark. Vedersø is also a singer in the Danish indie band The Eclectic Moniker. The band is signed with Warner Music label.

In 2012, The White Band released their debut EP called Conquistador followed by the studio album The Quiet Strum in 2014 The album reached number 4 on the official Danish Albums Chart. The follow-up album Songs from the Sun was released in 2017.

Discography

Albums

EPs
2012: Conquistador

Singles
2012: "Conquistador"
2016: "One by One"
2017: "The Snow"

References

Danish folk music groups
Musical groups established in 2011
2011 establishments in Denmark